Shawn Worthen (born September 12, 1978) is a former American football defensive tackle in the National Football League. He was drafted by the Minnesota Vikings in the fourth round of the 2001 NFL Draft and played for the Houston Texans in 2002. He played college football for the TCU Horned Frogs. He is currently Associate Athletics Director of Athletic Academic Services at TCU.

References

External links
 TCU Athletics bio

1978 births
Living people
Sportspeople from San Antonio
Players of American football from San Antonio
American football defensive tackles
TCU Horned Frogs football players
Minnesota Vikings players
Houston Texans players